Palotás is a surname of Hungarian origin. The name refers to:
 Péter Palotás (1929–1967), also referred to as Péter Poteleczky, was a Hungarian footballer 
 István Palotás (1908, date of death unknown) was a Hungarian football midfielder
 József Palotás (1911–1957) was a Hungarian wrestler

Palotás is the name of a Hungarian settlement:
 Palotás, Hungary 

German-language surnames
Occupational surnames